Albert S. Brandeis Elementary School is a former elementary school in Louisville, Kentucky that began operation in 1913. It is listed as a historic building with the National Register of Historic Places. It was patterned after the Charlton House in England. It was designed by J. Earl Henry, the renowned early 20th century Louisville architect.

The historic building is located at 1001 South 26th Street. The school itself operates at  2817 W. Kentucky St. in a modern facility. It became a math/science/technology magnet school in fall 1990. It was Louisville's first magnet program in an elementary school.

Design

The original school building occupies a city block between the Parkland and California neighborhoods. It is built of brick and has 2½ stories as well as a raised basement. The windows on the first and second floor are identical. A decorative gabled entrance spans the height of the building and includes a decorative scroll which reads "L.P.S." for Louisville Public School (the predecessor of Jefferson County Public Schools).

The building is designed in the Tudor Revival architecture style, although the entrance includes Gothic elements. Architect J. Henry Earl was heavily influenced by Robert Smythson, especially his designs for Wardour Castle and Charlton House.

A modestly styled addition was added to the back of the building in 1954. The elaborate original windows were replaced in 1962 steel frame vent windows.

History
Brandeis was one of the first schools built under the Louisville Independent School District, which spent equally in rich and poor neighborhoods, accounting for the large and stylish building in a working-class neighborhood.

The school was named after Albert S. Brandeis, who was one of the founders of the Louisville Board of Education.

In 1990, the school board announced Brandeis would be leaving its old building because it was too small and maintenance costs were too high. At the time, its principal said "The building has a lot of charm, but we've outdated it. Most of the major systems are in constant need of repair." A new  site was selected a few blocks away, which was previously the location of about 20 houses and some small businesses.

The move was completed in 1992. At the time, city officials hoped to buy the building and convert it to housing. The city bought the property in 1993 for $220,000. The property was used for public meetings in the mid-1990s as various plans were proposed to convert it to a new use. A non-profit group built a day care center on the original school property, behind the school building, in 1995.

However, the property suffered during this time, as parts of the roof caved in and vandals repeatedly struck. In 1996, it was finally converted to 50 private apartments. It was converted by the same not-for-profit group, New Directions Housing Corporation, that turned Theodore Roosevelt Elementary School in Portland into apartments. It continues to be an important landmark in its neighborhood.  The building now includes 50 apartments, an after school Learning Center and community garden.

See also
 Public schools in Louisville, Kentucky
 National Register of Historic Places listings in Louisville's West End

References

School buildings completed in 1913
Former school buildings in the United States
School buildings on the National Register of Historic Places in Kentucky
National Register of Historic Places in Louisville, Kentucky
1913 establishments in Kentucky
Educational institutions established in 1913
Tudor Revival architecture in Kentucky
Schools in Louisville, Kentucky
Public elementary schools in Kentucky
Magnet schools in Kentucky